Giovanni Montanari (born 24 April 1976) is an Italian former racing driver.

Career
Montanari began racing in Formula Opel between 1996 and 1997, representing Italy in the Nations Cup and winning in 1997 with Giovanni Anapoli. In the 1997 championship, he completed 13 races, winning 1 and securing 5 podium finishes. His points total, 103, meant he finished the season in 4th place. 

In 1998, Montanari graduated to International Formula 3000 where he drove for Draco Engineering. His best result came in Barcelona, where he qualified 7th and finished 8th. In 1999, he joined GP Racing but failed to qualify for either race he entered. Later in the season, he entered two races with Durango Racing, once again failing to qualify on both occasions. 

In 2000, Montanari stepped into Italian F3000 with previous employer Durango Formula. He completed the first three races of the season with a best finish of 5th at Mugello Circuit. In 2001, he raced in European F3000 for 5 races with B&C Competition. He suffered four retirements before finishing his final race with the team at Donington Park in 6th, meaning he scored a single championship point.

Complete International Formula 3000 results
(key) (Races in bold indicate pole position; races in italics indicate fastest lap.)

References

1976 births
Living people
Italian racing drivers
International Formula 3000 drivers
Place of birth missing (living people)

Piquet GP drivers
Durango drivers
Draco Racing drivers